DKOI ("Binary Code for Information Processing") is an EBCDIC encoding for Russian Cyrillic. It is a Telegraphy-based encoding used in ES EVM mainframes. It has been defined by several standards: GOST 19768-74 / ST SEV 358-76, ST SEV 358-88 / GOST 19768-93, CSN 36 9103.

DKOI K1

In DKOI K1 (ДКОИ К1), each Cyrillic letter is given its own code point. Characters are shown with their equivalent Unicode codes. The dollar sign  may be placed in code point 0x5B; in that case the currency sign  is in code point 0xE1.

DKOI K2 
In DKOI K2 (ДКОИ К2), some Cyrillic letters (А, В, Е, К, М, Н, О, Р, С, Т, Х, а, е, о, р, с, у, х) are merged with visually identical Latin letters (A, B, E, K, M, H, O, P, C, T, X, a, e, o, p, c, y, x). The dollar sign  may be placed in code point 0x5B; in that case the currency sign  is in code point 0xE1.

Code page 880 
IBM code page 880 is mostly a superset of DKOI K1, adding support for Cyrillic letters not used in Russian but used in Serbian Cyrillic, Macedonian Cyrillic, Belarusian Cyrillic or Soviet-era Ukrainian Cyrillic (i.e. including the Ukrainian Ye but not the Ukrainian Ge). 0x6A is a continuous vertical bar (like in code page 38), rather than a broken vertical bar (like in code pages 37 and 500), and 0x5B is always a dollar sign rather than a universal currency sign.

See also 
 EBCDIC 410
 EBCDIC 1025

Footnotes

References 

Character sets
EBCDIC code pages